Sergei Vladimirovich Krestov (born 6 October 1972 in Moscow; died 23 September 2002 in Moscow in a car accident) was a Russian football player.

External links
 

1972 births
Footballers from Moscow
2002 deaths
Soviet footballers
Russian footballers
FC Torpedo Moscow players
FC Torpedo-2 players
Russian Premier League players
Road incident deaths in Russia
Association football forwards
FC Spartak-2 Moscow players